Godan  may refer to:

 Godán, a parish in northern Spain
 Godan, Iran, a village in Sistan and Baluchestan Province, Iran
 Godan Khan, the son of Ögedei Khan
 Godan verb, a Japanese verb type
 Global Open Data for Agriculture and Nutrition, a UK-based NGO
 the fifth-degree black belt; see 
 the Lombard name for Odin, a god of Germanic paganism

See also
 Godaan, a Hindi novel by Munshi Premchand